Henry Barclay Swete  (14 March 1835 in Bristol – 10 May 1917 in Hitchin) was an English biblical scholar. He became Regius Professor of Divinity at Cambridge in 1890. He is known for his 1906 commentary on the Book of Revelation, and other works of exegesis.

Biography
Swete was educated at King's College London, and Gonville and Caius College, Cambridge, and in 1858 was ordained. From 1858 to 1865 he was assistant curate to his father John Swete at St Andrew's Blagdon in Somerset. Then after some years of work in various country curacies and livings he became in 1869 theological lecturer and tutor at Caius College.

In 1881 he became examining chaplain to the Bishop of St. Albans, and the following year was appointed professor of pastoral theology at King's College London. In 1890 he succeeded Brooke Foss Westcott as regius professor at Cambridge, and retained this position until 1915, when he retired with the title of emeritus professor. In June 1901, he received an honorary doctorate of Divinity from the University of Glasgow. The following year he was appointed to the office of Lady Margaret's preacher. He was in 1911 appointed an honorary chaplain to King George V.

Swete's works on biblical texts are of high importance. In 1887 he published the first volume of his edition of the Greek text of the Old Testament, completing the series in 1894 (3rd ed. 1901–7), while in 1898 appeared the Greek text of the Gospel of St. Mark, with notes and introduction (2nd ed. 1902) and in 1906 that of the Apocalypse of St. John (2nd ed. 1907).

He was the editor of Cambridge Theological Essays (1905) and Cambridge Biblical Essays (1909), and was a contributor to Smith and Wace's Dictionary of Christian Biography (1882–87) and Hastings's Dictionary of the Bible (1899–1900). He also produced many historical and critical works, including The Apostles' Creed in Relation to Primitive Christianity (1894; 3rd ed. 1899); Church Services and Service Books before the Reformation (1896); Patristic Study (1902); The Appearances of Our Lord after the Passion (1907; 2nd ed. 1908), and The Last Discourse and Prayer of Our Lord (1913).

He is buried in Hitchin Cemetery in Hertfordshire.

Selected works

References

External links
The Life and Works of Henry Barclay Swete (1835–1917)
An Introduction to the Old Testament in Greek, online text
An Introduction to the Old Testament in Greek, ccel.org
A Remembrance (1918) - large PDF scan

1835 births
1917 deaths
Academics of King's College London
Alumni of Gonville and Caius College, Cambridge
Alumni of King's College London
Anglican biblical scholars
British biblical scholars
British religious writers
Fellows of Gonville and Caius College, Cambridge
Fellows of the British Academy
New Testament scholars
Old Testament scholars
Regius Professors of Divinity (University of Cambridge)
Writers from Bristol